Rognac is a commune in the Bouches-du-Rhône department in the Provence-Alpes-Côte d'Azur region in Southern France. Located to the east of the Étang de Berre, north of Marseille Provence Airport, it is part of the Aix-Marseille-Provence Metropolis. In 2019, it had a population of 12,086.

Transport
Rognac is served by the Rognac TER PACA railway station, on both the Paris–Marseille railway and Rognac–Aix-en-Provence freight railway.

Demographics

International relations

Rognac is twinned with:

 Rockenhausen, Germany
 Veria, Greece

See also
 Étang de Berre
 Communes of the Bouches-du-Rhône department

References

Communes of Bouches-du-Rhône
Bouches-du-Rhône communes articles needing translation from French Wikipedia